XHVT-FM is a radio station on 104.1 FM in Villahermosa, Tabasco, Mexico, known as XEVT (its former AM call sign).

History
XEVT-AM 970 began testing on August 7, 1954, making it the first radio station in Tabasco. It was owned by Aquiles Calderón Marchenas and authorized to broadcast with 5,000 watts during the day and 400 at night. It conducted tests throughout August and early September. The concession was awarded on 14 September, and the very next day, XEVT was inaugurated by Governor Manuel Bartlett Bautista.

Not long after XEVT signed on, political turmoil roiled Tabasco. On March 16, 1955, a group attempted to use XEVT to broadcast messages fomenting unrest in the state. When the radio station's staff said no, they attempted to enter by force. One person died, and much of XEVT's new equipment was destroyed. Broadcasts resumed the next month.

The station changed hands and names regularly as time went on. Originally known as "La Voz de Tabasco", it soon became "Radio Fiesta", "Súper Variedades" and even for a time Stereorey. In 1978, the XEVT concession was transferred to Radio Sureste, S.A. The 1980s saw the station come under the management of Radio S.A. In 1999, it was sold to the Sibilla family (headed by Jesús Antonio Sibilla Zurita, 1922–1989), who relaunched XEVT as a full-service station with news and talk programs.; Jesús Antonio Sibilla Zurita had been associated with XEVT from the late 1950s, starting Telereportaje, the station's primary news program, until his 1989 death. On July 31, 2000, XEVT's concession transferred to Jasz Radio.

XEVT was approved to migrate to FM on June 4, 2010, becoming XHVT-FM 104.1.

References

Radio stations in Tabasco